Narango  (Farsaf, Farsav, Nambel) is an Oceanic language spoken on the south coast of Espiritu Santo Island in Vanuatu.

References

Espiritu Santo languages
Languages of Vanuatu